Spassky District is an administrative and municipal district (raion), one of the twenty-two in Primorsky Krai, Russia. It is located in the west of the krai. Its administrative center is the town of Spassk-Dalny (which is not administratively a part of the district). Population:

History
The district was established on January 4, 1926. On February 1, 1963, it was transformed into Spassky Rural District, but reverted to the original status on January 12, 1965.

Administrative and municipal status
Within the framework of administrative divisions, Spassky District is one of the twenty-two in the krai. The town of Spassk-Dalny serves as its administrative center, despite being incorporated separately as a town under krai jurisdiction—an administrative unit with the status equal to that of the districts.

As a municipal division, the district is incorporated as Spassky Municipal District. Spassk-Dalny Town Under Krai Jurisdiction is incorporated separately from the district as Spassk-Dalny Urban Okrug.

Economy
The Knorringskoye, or Khankayskoye, deposit of marble is located in the district—one of are only three such deposits in the world. Various souvenirs are produced from this marble.

Spassky District is one of the leading agricultural regions of the krai. Due to the unique microclimate of the Prikhankayskaya Flatland, vegetables, fruits, and berries ripen here earlier than elsewhere in the krai.

Notable residents 

Valentin Dubinin (born 1946 in Spasskoye), politician
Roman Yevgenyev (born 1999 in Spasskoye), football player

References

Notes

Sources

Districts of Primorsky Krai
States and territories established in 1926